James Yaakub is a Malaysian footballer who plays for Sarawak FA as a striker.

International career 
James Yaakub represented Malaysia from 1977 to 1978.   He was also a part of the Malaysian player that winning gold medals in the regional SEA Games in 1977.

Honours

Club
Sarawak FA
 Borneo Cup
Winners: 1983

International 
 SEA Games
Winners: 1977

References 

Malaysian footballers
Malaysia international footballers
Southeast Asian Games gold medalists for Malaysia
Southeast Asian Games medalists in football
Association football forwards
Competitors at the 1977 Southeast Asian Games
1953 births
Living people